Gonçalvo Mello (born 18 November 1931) is a Portuguese former sailor. He competed in the Dragon event at the 1960 Summer Olympics.

References

External links
 

1931 births
Living people
Portuguese male sailors (sport)
Olympic sailors of Portugal
Sailors at the 1960 Summer Olympics – Dragon
Sportspeople from Cascais